Washington Township is an inactive township in Clark County, in the U.S. state of Missouri.

Washington Township has the name of President George Washington.

References

Townships in Missouri
Townships in Clark County, Missouri